Neighbours is an Australian television soap opera. It was first broadcast on 18 March 1985 and airs on digital channel 10 Peach. The following is a list of characters that appeared in the show in 2019, by order of first appearance. All characters are introduced by the shows executive producer Jason Herbison. Raymond Renshaw and Ivan Renshaw were introduced during the second week of January, followed by Vera Punt and Melissa Lohan. Claudia Watkins began appearing from March, with Roxy Willis arriving in April. Dean Mahoney and Vance Abernethy made their first appearances in May. June saw the introduction of Ebony Buttrose. Harlow Robinson made her debut in July, while Mackenzie Hargreaves began appearing from August. Scarlett Brady and Hendrix Greyson arrived in September, along with Prudence Wallace and Graham Isheev. Mackenzie's father Grant Hargreaves was introduced in October. Kane Jones made his first appearance during the following month.

Raymond and Ivan Renshaw 

Raymond Renshaw, played by Frank Magree, and Ivan Renshaw, played by Michael Shanahan, made their first appearances on 11 January 2019. The Renshaws are a Sydney crime family. They have been mentioned several times since the arrival of Leo Tanaka (Tim Kano) in 2016, who reported Ivan and Raymond's money laundering to the police. Raymond's daughter Delaney Renshaw (Ella Newton) was introduced in December 2018. Conor McMullan of Digital Spy commented, "We tipped Neighbours Renshaw family storyline as one of the loose ends that the show needed to tie up earlier this year, and as 2018 draws to a close, they may be doing just that."

In late December, it was confirmed that Ivan and Raymond would be central to "a shock siege" storyline, as they come to Erinsborough to get revenge on Leo for his part in sending them to prison. Ivan tracks Leo down at The Waterhole and shoots at him, but Terese Willis (Rebekah Elmaloglou) takes the bullet instead. In the aftermath, Raymond is ushered into Harold Cafe as he tries to leave the complex, and he holds everyone hostage at gunpoint. During his piece about Neighbours channelling the work of filmmaker David Lynch, John Allison of The Guardian wrote about Raymond: "Let's not put too fine a point on this: he was dressed like Evil Cooper from Twin Peaks: The Return. That leather jacket! The hair! Even the shoes! Within 10 minutes of his appearance, he had ordered the execution of Robinson scion Leo Tanaka. And, to underscore the point, every evil pronouncement was accompanied by an atonal orchestral sting straight out of Twin Peaks notorious atomic bomb sequence."

When Delaney Renshaw returns to her hotel room, she finds Raymond and Ivan waiting for her, following their release from prison. Ivan leaves the room while Raymond talks with Delaney and learns that she came to Erinsborough to see Leo Tanaka, as she fell in love with him while he was working at Raymond's club in Sydney. She then tells him that Leo was the one who went to the police about his money laundering, not Mannix. Raymond and Ivan decide to shoot Leo, and Raymond tells Ivan to get Leo alone so there are no witnesses. Ivan finds Leo in The Waterhole and fires the gun, but Terese Willis jumps in front of Leo taking the bullet. Ivan flees the scene and calls Raymond to tell him what happened. Raymond leaves Delaney and comes down to the complex, where he spots Leo and the police. He enters Harold's Café and the customers assume he is just a hotel guest. Mark Brennan (Scott McGregor) and Ned Willis (Ben Hall) find Ivan on Power Road trying to break into a car. Mark confronts him and Ned tackles him to the ground.

Raymond tries to leave the café, but Elly Conway (Jodi Anasta) tells him to stay put as the police are continuing to sweep the area for Ivan's partner. She later tells him that he can go, but he notices that she does not tell anyone else and realises that she knows the police are looking for him. He pulls out his gun and orders Elly to collect all the phones, Yashvi Rebecchi (Olivia Junkeer) to lock the door and Chloe Brennan (April Rose Pengilly) to barricade it. He then hears Kirsha Rebecchi (Vani Dhir) on the phone to the police. He orders everyone to get on the ground, and asks the police to get him a van. Elly convinces him that he cannot take all the hostages with him, and he eventually lets an older couple and the children go. She tells him to just take her with him, but Chloe argues that he should take her instead. Raymond fires the gun at the ceiling and tells them to shut up. Leo comes to the café and Raymond lets him inside, where he confronts his role in sending him and Ivan to prison. Leo asks him to think about Delaney, but Raymond refuses to listen and raises his gun to shoot just as the police come inside and tackle him to the ground. Raymond is arrested and is later shown handcuffed in the police station.

Vera Punt

Vera Punt played by Sally-Anne Upton, made her first appearance on 23 January 2019. Upton's management confirmed her casting in the recurring guest role on 14 January 2019. Vera is the sister of Valerie Grundy (Patti Newton), who dies during the previous month. Daniel Kilkelly from Digital Spy reported that Vera arrives on Ramsay Street to retrieve her sister's dog Regina Grundy (Timba). He added that Vera takes Regina and this causes an argument with her new owners David Tanaka (Takaya Honda) and Aaron Brennan (Matt Wilson), who threaten legal action. Of her character, Upton commented, "She just says it how it is. Shows like Neighbours need characters like Mrs Punt who have got a bit of an edge and unpredictability about them." Upton thought Vera would get along with her Wentworth character Juicy Lucy, saying they both "Aussie Larrikin" types. Joanne Hawkins of realestate.com.au said Vera has been described as being "so despicable, you can't help but love her." Laura Masia of TV Week called her "the town whinger". Ahead of her guest stint in early 2021, Upton worked as the show's COVID-19 nurse and she called it "one of the most important roles of my life". She was also grateful that the producers wrote new storylines for her character as a thank you. Vera appears in the final episode of Neighbours and Upton said of filming the finale, "It feels wonderful to be back on Ramsay Street. Sad at the same time, but it's part of history finishing and I'm just glad to be a part of it."

Aaron Brennan and David Tanaka spot Vera with Regina in Ramsay Street and ask her where she found their dog, but Vera tells them that Regina belongs to her. David and Aaron explain that they have been looking after Regina since Vera's sister died. When she refuses to give the dog back, David calls her a dognapper. Aaron later talks with Vera about how he and David have fallen in love with Regina, and he offers to buy her. Vera tells him that Regina was bequeathed to her, and if he wants Regina then they will have to go through a judge. David and Aaron eventually decide to let Regina go with Vera, who presents them with a vets bill before leaving for Bendigo. Vera later meets with Melissa Lohan (Jacqui Purvis) about selling Valerie's house. She then walks through the Lassiter's complex where Leo Tanaka (Tim Kano) is vandalising a Valentine's Day display. He throws a large floral display which hits Vera and knocks her to the ground. Leo's family see that she is okay and ask her not to call the police. Sheila Canning (Colette Mann) talks with Vera and asks her not to sue Leo. She mentions that his father Paul Robinson (Stefan Dennis) is actually the one with the money, and implies the accident could have happened to anyone with all the decorations hanging up, so Vera sues Lassiters. Vera comes to Lassiters to hear a public apology from Leo, but he gets into an argument with Paul and Terese Willis (Rebekah Elmaloglou), causing Vera to leave.

Vera later expresses her disgust when Roxy Willis (Zima Anderson) strips off while she rides a mechanical bull on grounds of the Lassiters complex. Vera attends a charity bachelor auction at The Waterhole and buys Aaron for $275. Just over a year later, she watches a live stream of David performing at a lip-sync contest. She then interrupts a conversation between the Rebecchis to let them know they are missing a great performance from David and Mackenzie Hargreaves (Georgie Stone). While walking through the Lassiters Complex, Vera trips over some Easter decorations, injuring her ankle. David and Terese send her to Erinsborough Hospital, where she refuses to be treated by Karl Kennedy (Alan Fletcher), who was recently accused of assault, so David takes over. Vera's nephew Curtis Perkins (Nathan Borg) later comes to visit her. As Karl is watering his front yard, he notices dog faeces on his grass and accuses Vera of allowing Regina to defecate on his lawn, before accidentally spraying her with his hose. Vera is enraged and storms off. Karl later finds a pile of manure on his lawn and accuses Vera of putting it there in retaliation for getting sprayed. Karl collects all of the manure in a wheelbarrow and goes over to Vera's house, where she is mowing her grass. Vera denies his accusations and in an attempt to stop him from dumping the manure on the grass, Vera grabs some and throws it at Karl, but hits Paul instead. Paul and Karl team up and order a truckload of manure to be dumped on Vera's front yard. As the truck is about to pour the manure over, Melanie Pearson (Lucinda Cowden) reveals that she was responsible for the first lot of manure, after initially sending it to Angela Lane (Amanda Harrison), who then dumped it on Karl's lawn.

Vera attends Melanie's Christmas party psychic booth and asks her to speak with Valerie. Vera later expresses that she is a victim of a contagious itch that has been spreading through the community. At Leo's winery ladies' lunch, Vera tells Jane Harris (Annie Jones) she would not live long enough to store wine barrels for twenty years. Jane's daughter, Nicolette Stone (Charlotte Chimes), says that she would be surprised and disappointed if Vera had twenty years left, then Vera scares off Melanie by saying she has aging bones. Vera talks about Terese's alcoholism relapse and Harlow Robinson (Jemma Donovan) says that Vera's opinion does not matter. Vera begins criticising everyone at the table, so Nicolette throws a glass of water over her face. Vera then declares she is never setting foot into the winery again. Vera attends a Ramsay Street party with her nephew a months later, where Vera speaks with her neighbours and befriends Angie Rebecchi (Lesley Baker).

Melissa Lohan 

Melissa "Mel" Lohan, played by Jacqui Purvis, made her first appearance on 25 January 2019. Mel is Chloe Brennan's (April Rose Pengilly) former girlfriend, who producers introduced as part of an on-going exploration of Chloe's background, bisexuality, and unrequited love story with Elly Conway (Jodi Anasta). The former couple had a bad break up, with Pengilly explaining "When Mel left Chloe initially it was really vindictive and vengeful and she left her in a dangerous situation." Mel was branded a "villain", "ruthless" and "sinister" by Charlie Milward of the Daily Express, after he observed her efforts to secure a job with the Robinson Pines development. Milward also said that Paul Robinson (Stefan Dennis) could be in danger, as Mel begins to "stir up trouble". While bemoaning the show's tendency to have a "guest villain of the week", Conor McMullan of Digital Spy thought Mel could have been "a great recurring character, or better yet a regular, but her unfortunate decision to commit arson might just get in the way of that." McMullan also praised Purvis, saying she played Mel "brilliantly". The character departed on 4 March.

Mel comes to Erinsborough to visit her former girlfriend Chloe Brennan, after receiving an invitation from Chloe's brother Aaron Brennan (Matt Wilson). She initially watches Chloe, Aaron and Elly Conway decorating the local pub, The Waterhole, and approaches Elly to comment that she and Chloe look like they are more than friends, but Elly tells her she is engaged to Chloe's brother. Mel comes to Ramsay Street to see Chloe, who shuts the door on her and refuses to talk to her. Mel tells Aaron that she is remorseful for stealing from Chloe and leaving her in debt, so he arranges for them to talk. Mel apologises to Chloe for leaving her and tells her she will pay her back. Chloe and Mel agree to be friends again. Mel reads about the Robinson Pines housing development and introduces herself to Paul Robinson in the hope of securing a job as a sales agent, but Paul turns her down as his daughter Amy Williams (Zoe Cramond) has a team in place. Mel later comes by to see Chloe, who is about to send out an email invitation to the Robinson Pines sale, and she manages changes the time while Chloe is out of the room. The following day, Mel comes by the sale and helps Amy and Paul out by talking to potential investors, leading Paul to offer her a job as sales manager. Chloe kisses Mel and they spend the night together. Mel soon learns that Chloe is in love with Elly, but agrees to keep it to herself. She also convinces Paul to extend Robinson Pines and she meets with Lucas Fitzgerald (Scott Major) to discuss selling his garage.

During an outing to the beach, Chloe tells Mel that she has been diagnosed with Huntington's disease. Mel's supportive response leads Chloe to give their relationship a second chance. Mel purchases an office in the Lassiters complex, and pays Heath Kabel (Tim Conlon) to turn away business at the garage. When he tells her that the apprentice Bea Nilsson (Bonnie Anderson) is rebooking the cancelled job, she asks for his keys and starts a fire at the garage with a faulty power board, unaware that Bea is sleeping inside a van. Bea accuses Mel of starting the fire, after seeing her giving money to Heath. Lucas later agrees to sell the garage, along with other Power Road business owners. Chloe also accuses Mel of starting the fire, after learning that she threw out a faulty power board from Number 24. Mel denies everything, but Chloe tells her that she no longer trusts her and ends their relationship. Mel replies that no one will want Chloe when she becomes sick and leaves. Elly confronts Mel the following day for almost killing her sister, but Mel accuses her of undermining her relationship with Chloe, and threatens to tell Mark about the kiss. Elly says that if Mel loves Chloe, she will keep it to herself and leave, which she does. Mel is later found and arrested in South Australia, after Heath makes a deal with the police.

Claudia Watkins 

Claudia Watkins, played by Kate Raison, made her first appearance on 29 March 2019. The character was introduced as the estranged mother of Finn Kelly (Rob Mills). During another guest  appearance in December, Claire Crick of What's on TV called the character a "trouble-making mum". Raison reprised the role again in April 2020, following Finn's exit. Claudia's arrival in Erinsborough also facilitated the return of former recurring character Samantha Fitzgerald (Simone Buchanan). Johnathon Hughes of the Radio Times branded the character a "tough cookie", "calculating" and "menacing". He observed that due to Elly Conway's (Jodi Anasta) history with Claudia's sons "there's not much love lost between the ladies". Anasta agreed with the assessment and she told him "From the moment Claudia arrives, Elly is the only one fully on her guard. She tells the rest of the Kennedys she only ever visits when she wants something. From what she knows of the family's backstory, Shaun was the good side – Finn and Claudia are definitely the bad!" Anasta admitted that she was a fan of Raison from her time in E Street and A Country Practice. She commented, "We've worked together quite a bit as Elly and Claudia over the last year, lots of intense two-hander scenes. I've learnt a lot from her, she's just beautiful."

After she is contacted by her son Finn Kelly's doctor Karl Kennedy (Alan Fletcher), Claudia comes to Erinsborough. Karl offers to take Claudia to see Finn, who has recently woken from a coma and has amnesia, but she tells him she is only in town to collect her younger son, Shaun Watkins (Brad Moller). Claudia admits that she had little to do with Finn when he was growing up, and calls him a psychopath. Shaun convinces his mother to stay and see Finn, by threatening to stay in town. Upon seeing Finn waiting for her, Claudia changes her mind and runs off. She meets Susan Kennedy (Jackie Woodburne) and asks her what her agenda towards Finn is. She then tells Susan that she is absolved for pushing Finn off the cliff, but Susan wants to discuss Finn's childhood. Claudia explains how his stepfather, Errol thought he was evil. Claudia visits Finn and asks that he severs ties with Shaun and his lawyer, before he drags them down with him. Claudia attempts to offer Susan compensation money, but Susan rejects it and gives Claudia a photo album and a letter from Finn that he wrote while he was being held hostage in Columbia, which prompts Claudia to visit Finn once more. She asks about his lawyer's skills and then tells him that she has kept a photo. Claudia says goodbye to Shaun and tells him to get Finn's lawyer to send the bills to her.

At the end of the year, Claudia visits Finn and Elly Conway, who is carrying Shaun's child, wanting to make amends following Shaun's death in an avalanche. Finn discovers that she paid both Dean Mahoney (Henry Strand) and a private investigator to dig up dirt on Elly's past. Claudia asks him to watch Elly and report back to her, but Finn refuses. She then reveals that she was behind the fire that destroyed the evidence in his case. Recognising that Finn has feelings for Elly, she informs his girlfriend and Elly's sister Bea Nilsson (Bonnie Anderson). Following Finn's death, Claudia returns to Erinsborough and meets her granddaughter Aster Conway (Isla Goulas; Scout Bowman) and begins scheming to get custody, knowing that Elly has been charged with voluntary manslaughter. She hires Samantha Fitzgerald as her lawyer, later finding out that Sam has history with the Kennedys, and begins trying to discredit the family. Claudia and Samantha assist Angela Lane (Amanda Harrison), and other members of Erinsborough High's PTA, when they call for Susan's resignation to compile more stress on her. Claudia blackmails Elly's judge into giving her a custodial sentence, but she is blindsided by Elly's decision to take Aster into the prison with her. She pays Andrea Somers (Madeleine West) to start a prison riot, so Elly will change her mind about keeping Aster with her. Claudia witnesses Susan lashing out at one of her students Mackenzie Hargreaves (Georgie Stone) and she confronts Susan, declaring that she wants custody of Aster. Claudia sets down roots in Erinsborough, buying the penthouse and attempting to buy Chloe Brennan's (April Rose Pengilly) island, where Finn committed a series of crimes. She gathers evidence about Susan's mental instability and claims the Kennedys and Bea cannot look after Aster as well as she could, which convinces the judge to give her temporary custody of Aster.

After much consideration, Chloe and her husband Pierce Greyson (Tim Robards) decide to sell the island to Claudia, but then Chloe chooses to keep a close eye on Claudia, realising that her bid for custody of Aster was a scheme. Claudia enlists the help of other Ramsay Street teens Hendrix Greyson (Benny Turland), Harlow Robinson (Jemma Donovan) and Mackenzie  to assist her in setting up the camp. Chloe and her brother Aaron Brennan (Matt Wilson) overhear Claudia speaking to a police officer and discover that she was responsible for the fire that destroyed the evidence in Finn's case. When Aaron confronts Claudia, she offers him assistance in his goal to become a foster parent in exchange for his silence. Aaron rejects this but pretends to accept so that Chloe, Susan and Bea can search the penthouse for evidence of her bribing the officer. When she returns, Claudia discovers that they are trying to find evidence against her, and decides to flee the country on her private jet, which was carrying the rest of her household goods from Geneva. Upon reaching the airport, she discovers that Shaun was rescued a few days before and flew on the jet after finding out she was in Melbourne. He tells Claudia that he survived in a hut with a sprained ankle on limited rations for six months and then demands to know why Aster is with her, forcing her to confess. As Bea and Susan arrive, Shaun convinces her to confess her crimes to the police. Although she initially refuses, Claudia decides to do so after Samantha rejects her for not leaving the country. Shaun then tells Claudia he will never forgive her. Elly later visits Claudia before she is remanded and Claudia reiterates her belief that Elly killed Finn and is not a proper parent for Aster. Furious, Elly tells Claudia that she will never see Aster again and Claudia is charged.

Roxy Willis

Roxy Willis, played by Zima Anderson, made her first appearance on 29 April 2019. The character and Anderson's casting details were announced on 14 April 2019. Anderson had wanted to secure a role on Neighbours since she moved to Melbourne, where it is filmed, two years prior. Of joining the cast, Anderson stated "I've been so lucky with the role of Roxy, I've already found myself in a wide range of crazy situations from virtually the first scene which has been so much fun and really challenged me, I'm constantly learning." Roxy is introduced as "a wild girl from the Northern Territory" and the niece of regular character Terese Willis (Rebekah Elmaloglou), although Anderson pointed out that she is not actually related to Terese by blood. She is the daughter of Adam Willis (Ian Williams) and Gemma Ramsay (Beth Buchanan). Gemma hopes Terese can sort out Roxy's rebellious ways using her own experiences. Anderson described Roxy as being "very fun and very naughty". She is also "full of heart", "bubbly", "sporadic and does whatever she wants." Roxy's older boyfriend Vance Abernethy (Conrad Coleby) was also introduced shortly after her arrival.

Dean Mahoney 

Dean Mahoney, played by Henry Strand, made his first appearance on 2 May 2019. The character and Strand's casting were announced in the June 2019 edition of Soap World. Dean is introduced as the son of Dr Dora Dietrich (Kirsty Hillhouse) and billed as a "disobedient student". Their reporter stated that Dean is a pupil at Erinsborough High and he clashes with his pregnant teacher Elly Conway (Jodi Anasta). Elly disciplines Dean which prompts him to concoct a revenge plan. He reveals that he is Dora's son and knowing that Elly is a patient of Dora's, he accesses Elly's medical records and discovers that she has lied about her pregnancy. Dean tells Elly that he will not reveal the truth as long as she does as he asks. The reporter added that Dean would force Elly to break the law and subsequently attract a second blackmailer. The character returned on 5 December, as he stalks Elly and admits responsibility for her losing her job.

After Dean is given a detention by his teacher Elly Conway, he tries to argue his way out of it and Yashvi Rebecchi (Olivia Junkeer) tells him to give Elly a break. Elly notices Dean has not completed an assignment, and when he calls her a drainer, she increases his one detention to a weeks worth. When Dean goes to Erinsborough Hospital to meet his mother Dr Dietrich for lunch, he learns that Elly is her patient and looks at her file. Back at school, Dean reveals to Elly that he knows she is lying to her husband about her baby and wants a high grade on the assignment he has not done. Elly warns him that what he has done is illegal, and threatens to report him. Dean notices Elly and her husband having breakfast and makes a point of coming over and bringing up the subject of their baby. He later receives a B grade for his assignment, which makes Yashvi suspicious. When she confronts Dean, he pours a drink over her head and Elly gives him another week of detention. Dean then blackmails Elly into buying him alcohol for outdoor education camp, but he does not get anything, after Elly is caught and later hospitalised. Dean then steals a picture of her ultrasound scan to continue his blackmail, drawing Finn Kelly's (Rob Mills) attention. Finn pays Dean to transfer to another school.

A few months later, Dean follows Elly through the Lassiters Complex. Finn later catches him stalking Elly and confronts him, but they are interrupted by Toadfish Rebecchi (Ryan Moloney), giving Dean the opportunity to flee. Elly later meets Dean in the complex and he explains that he heard she was fired from Erinsborough High, before asking if it was because of him. Elly tells him it happened recently, but Dean wonders if he was part of the reason. He apologises for scaring her and for what happened between them. When Elly asks why now, Dean tells her that he dropped out of school, struggled to find work and has been couch-surfing, which made him realise how awful he was to her when she was going through a bad time. He adds that he will not bother her anymore. Hours later, he meets with Finn's mother Claudia Watkins (Kate Raison), whose private investigator paid him for information on Elly's past.

Vance Abernethy 

Vance Abernethy, played by Conrad Coleby, made his first appearance on 16 May 2019. The character and Coleby's casting was announced on 18 April 2019. Of his joining the cast, Coleby said "It's been amazing! They're a great bunch of people who are so lovely to work with. Rebekah Elmaloglou [Terese] and I get along really well – I'm having such a good time!" Chris Edwards of Digital Spy reported that Vance "is set to stir things up from the moment he sets foot onto Ramsay Street." Vance is the older boyfriend of Roxy Willis (Zima Anderson), and a former boyfriend of Terese Willis (Elmaloglou), who "led her down a wild path back in the day." Coleby explained that Vance and Roxy's relationship is "spicy" and "affectionate". They share "a deep connection, and a very fun one." Vance is aware of how Terese and Roxy are related, and he enjoys the memories of his relationship with Terese, but he think she is living a lie. Coleby added that Vance would get under her skin and clash with her partner Paul Robinson (Stefan Dennis).

Vance comes to Erinsborough to meet up with his girlfriend Roxy Willis, who reveals to Leo Tanaka (Tim Kano) that her share of the money used to purchase half of the Back Lane Bar came from Vance, making him Leo's new partner. To get Leo on side, Vance puts a stop to Roxy's plan to give the bar an outback theme. Vance later comes face to face with his former girlfriend Terese, after Roxy takes him home to meet her aunt. He is also reacquainted with Ned Willis (Ben Hall), who introduced him and Roxy. Terese realises that Roxy does not know that they dated, and Vance says he does not want to ruin Roxy's fresh start. He assures Terese that he loves Roxy. Terese also decides to keep their connection a secret from Roxy and her partner Paul Robinson. Vance takes delivery of a race horse that he and Roxy are selling to fund their life together, however, their buyer pulls out of the deal. Leo realises that the horse is stolen and that Roxy does not know. Vance attempts to find a new buyer for the horse, but Roxy sells it to Paul for a low price. Ned also learns that the horse is stolen and tells Terese, who gives Vance a week to break up with Roxy and leave town. She then convinces Paul to cancel the sale. Vance finds another buyer for the horse and tells Leo that he is leaving town without Roxy. While saying goodbye to Terese outside Lassiters Hotel, Vance tells her she will always be his first love and they share a hug.

When Terese learns Vance has sold the horse to Pierce Greyson (Tim Robards), she goes to the stables and threatens to call the police if he does not cancel the sale. Vance knows she is bluffing as she cares for him still. Instead Paul calls the police upon learning from Leo that Vance stole money from the bar. Terese tells Vance to run, and refuses to leave with him when he asks. Weeks later, Vance returns to town after learning of a kiss between Roxy and Paul, who he attacks. Roxy insists that she made advances towards Paul out of revenge. Gary Canning (Damien Richardson) is blamed for the attack on Paul, but Roxy feels increasingly guilty about letting an innocent man take the fall for Vance's crime. She asks him to confess if he really loves her, and Vance finds the police waiting for him as he attempts to leave the backpackers' hostel.

Ebony Buttrose 

Ebony Buttrose, played by Christie Hayes, made her first appearance on 7 June 2019. Hayes's casting was announced on 24 March 2019. Of joining the cast, the actress stated,"I am so lucky to join the cast of Neighbours, it's a dream come true. Literally a dream I had a while back I was working on the series and now I am! I was beyond excited and cried when I found out I had the role because I love acting. It is the best professional experience I have had in television and I love waking up every day to play my character." Hayes's character will become involved in a "complex" love triangle, and it was later confirmed she is Pierce Greyson's (Tim Robards) fiancée. A reporter for Inside Soap wrote that Pierce's former girlfriend Chloe Brennan (April Rose Pengilly) would be suspicious of Ebony and learns she has lots of secrets. Hayes said Ebony had "a lot of layers to her."

Ebony comes to the Back Lane Bar to meet her fiancé Pierce Greyson, and walks in on him being kissed by Chloe Brennan. She asks what is going on and Pierce tells her it is a misunderstanding. The following day, while having breakfast in The Waterhole, Ebony spots Chloe and invites her over for a coffee, where she tells Chloe about how she met Pierce at a charity gala. Ebony convinces Pierce to buy them a house while they are staying in Melbourne. Terese lets Ebony have Chloe as her personal concierge, as she sets up an office for her perfume business. Ebony makes Chloe move a chair around the room several times, before warning her that she will not be getting Pierce back and not to make an enemy of her. Chloe tells Ebony that she is concerned about Pierce bankrolling her perfume line and Ebony thinks she is calling her a golddigger. Pierce asks Ebony about Chloe, knowing that things will be awkward between them, but she says that if he gives them some space she will befriend Chloe. Pierce and Ebony buy a house together, but she tries to keep him away from it, telling him that it needs to be decorated.

Chloe learns that Ebony's crystal perfume bottles are actually made of glass, and finds records of bank transfers from Ebony to a private account. Ebony admits that she is taking some of the money she gets from Pierce and giving it to her sister, Crystal Buttrose (Rachel Soding), who is a single mother and staying at the new house. Ebony also reveals that she has not told Pierce about her sister. Chloe helps to find Crystal a place to live, and after Pierce catches her at the house, she asks Ebony to talk to him, but Ebony wants to wait until after the wedding. However, she eventually tells Pierce about Crystal and the money. She explains that she initially saw him as a way to a better life, but she fell in love with him and was scared of losing him if he knew about her family situation. Pierce asks Ebony to sign an agreement in which she agrees to commit to their marriage, without profiting from it, or he will give her $250,000 to walk away. Ebony signs the agreement, but her feelings of insecurity over Chloe and Pierce's friendship emerge. She asks Chloe if she is in love with Pierce, but Chloe assures her that she does not have to worry. Ebony later witnesses Pierce and Chloe hugging, and she decides to take the cheque Pierce offered her and leaves town.

Harlow Robinson 

Harlow Robinson, played by Jemma Donovan, made her first appearance on 15 July 2019. The character and Donovan's casting details were announced on 26 March 2019 via the show's social media. She commented, "I am so happy and very honoured to be a part of a series which has been enjoyed by generations." Donovan's father Jason Donovan played Harlow's great-uncle Scott Robinson, while her grandfather Terence Donovan played Doug Willis. Executive producer Jason Herbison stated that Donovan did "a fantastic audition" and her family connection was "an unexpected surprise". The role of Harlow was written for Donovan, and the character's storyline is similar to her own story of moving to Australia from the UK. Harlow is a member of the show's Robinson family, who were introduced in the first episode in 1985. Simon Timblick of the Radio Times said that Harlow's place within the family would be revealed in the coming months. Shortly before her arrival, it was confirmed that Harlow is Robert Robinson's (Adam Hunter) daughter. Paul and his son David Tanaka (Takaya Honda) meet Harlow at the prison where Robert is held. She misses out on the chance to meet her father, but is invited back to Erinsborough by David. Tina Burke of TV Week described the character as "quick witted and complicated", while Donovan stated that Harlow is "very head strong, and I enjoy playing that type of character who knows what she is doing and likes to get involved and Harlow seems to have those qualities." On 17 May 2022, Sam Warner and Daniel Kilkelly of Digital Spy confirmed that Donovan had finished filming on the serial and Harlow would be departing the soap ahead of its finale in August 2022.

Mackenzie Hargreaves 

Mackenzie Hargreaves, played by Georgie Stone, made her first appearance on 30 August 2019. She is the show's first transgender character, and the second trans actress to portray a trans character on Australian television. Stone's casting was announced on 23 March 2019. She had approached the show about introducing a transgender character in 2018. She wrote a letter to executive producer Jason Herbison with some ideas and received a response two hours later. Following an audition, Stone was castin the role and she worked with the producers for eight months to ensure that parts of her own story would be included in the character's storyline. Of her casting, Stone stated "I am so excited to be joining such an iconic show. Neighbours is all about telling stories we can connect to, stories that reflect our society today. It has progressed so much since it first began, which is why I thought it was time to have a trans character on the show. I can't wait for everyone to meet her!" Herbison added that during her audition, he became aware that Stone "would be able to tell the story truthfully and authentically". Stone explained to a columnist for The Australian Women's Weekly that she knew her character's story would have to have drama, but she helped to "ensure it's truthful at the same time" by including various experiences that trans people go through, including coming out, relationships, and shame due to bullying.

Scarlett Brady 

Scarlett Brady, played by Christie Whelan Browne, made her first appearance on 9 September 2019. Whelan Browne's casting and her character details were announced on 17 June 2019. She admitted she was lucky to get the role and was unsure how it happened. She commented, "I'd auditioned a couple of times in the past. Perhaps I just seemed like a 'Scarlett' – which you can decide is a compliment (or not) after you meet her." Milly Haddrick of New Idea said Scarlett was "a troubled woman with a very dark past (and one hell of a hidden agenda!)." Whelan Browne concurred and called her character "very complex". Scarlett comes to Erinsborough with an agenda concerning a male character. Whelan Browne added that Scarlett has had her share of "pain and struggles", and she hoped viewers would have some sympathy for her, even if they shake their heads at her actions. On 3 September 2020, Jess Less of Digital Spy confirmed Whelan Browne had reprised the role. The actress said she was excited about returning, and continued "Scarlett is complex, and I knew the storyline that was planned was going to be very fun. It is fun to play her and try and empathise with her actions." Whelan Browne was five weeks pregnant when she began filming Scarlett's return scenes, but she felt safe on set and found it "comforting" to be able to work amidst the COVID-19 pandemic. Scarlett's return aired on 15 September, as she seeks revenge on Ned. She departed on 26 October.

After his flight is delayed, Ned Willis (Ben Hall) comes across Scarlett, who is wearing a wedding dress and crying at a bar in the airport. He hands her a tissue and decides to keep her company. Scarlett explains that her fiancé Rex called off their wedding in the middle of the ceremony, and she has maxed out her credit card paying for a flight home. Ned buys them some drinks. Scarlett sees Ned's phone passcode as he enters it, and later deletes a text message about an available flight. Before Ned leaves for a hotel, they take a selfie together. A week later, Scarlett comes to Erinsborough and Ned notices her in the local cafe. She tells him that she is on a personal tour of the country and thought she would start with Erinsborough after he told her about it. Realising that Ned works at Lassiters Hotel, Scarlett mentions that she has plenty of hospitality experience. She later places a suitcase behind porter Trevor Nugent (Warwick Sadler), causing him to trip over. With Trevor hospitalised, Ned offers Scarlett a job covering his shifts. To thank him, Scarlett buys them lunch, which is interrupted by Ned's girlfriend Yashvi Rebecchi (Olivia Junkeer). After they leave, Scarlett looks at a scrapbook, which contains information about her failed wedding and deceased family, and admires the selfie she took of herself and Ned. When Scarlett mentions that she is lonely, Ned gives her a tour of the area and they book dinner for three at The 82. Scarlett attempts to cause trouble between Ned and Yashvi by bringing up their age gap, before mentioning that she and Ned met at the airport, which upsets Yashvi as Ned did not tell her.

Scarlett tries to befriend Yashvi and moves into the spare room at Number 32 Ramsay Street. She spies on Ned while he showering and takes photos of him. After learning about how protective Ned can be around his former girlfriend Bea Nilsson (Bonnie Anderson), Scarlett sabotages Bea's microphone lead and calls Ned to The Waterhole on the pretext of a mix up with his shifts. Just as he goes to leave, Bea receives an electric shock. Ned helps break the connection and takes her to the hospital, making him late to meet Yashvi. Scarlett gives Yashvi an edited version of what happened to Bea and plays up Ned's involvement in helping her, which leads to them taking a break from their relationship. Scarlett uses the opportunity to get closer to Ned, and she learns that Bea has developed a heart arrhythmia from the electric shock. Scarlett soon declares that her former boyfriend Rex is stalking her, and Ned offers to stay over at Number 32 for the night. When she learns Yashvi is coming over, Scarlett lays down next to a sleeping Ned on the couch, so Yashvi catches them together. Yashvi then breaks up with Ned. Scarlett claims Rex has threatened her, and she later pays someone to throw a brick through the kitchen window, so Ned will stay with her. Scarlett initiates a kiss between them and they have sex, but Scarlett notices that Ned regrets it. She then tells Yashvi what happened and pretends to be attracted to Kyle Canning (Chris Milligan) to make Ned jealous.

Paul Robinson (Stefan Dennis) learns that Scarlett has lied about working in hotels and attempts to fire her, but she reveals that she found a hidden camera in one of the rooms and will go to the press if he does. Scarlett pretends that she has lost her phone at The 82 and while she and Ned are looking for it, he is struck by a speeding motorbike and suffers a dislocated shoulder. Scarlett insists that Ned moves into Number 32 and she soon seduces him. Yashvi confronts Scarlett about her former boyfriend Scott Mayfair (Tom Jackson), who says that she tried to kill him, but Scarlett insists that Scott is lying. She then convinces Ned to leave town for a country B&B. To celebrate Halloween, Ned and Scarlett dress up, but Ned is thrown when Scarlett wears a wedding dress and starts talking about their future. Scarlett tells Ned they are meant to be together, but when he tries to leave, she stabs him with a cheese knife. She then chases Ned through the maze, as Bea and Yashvi enter to rescue Ned. Scarlett slashes Yashvi's leg, while Bea helps Ned to escape. He collapses by a tree, where Scarlett finds him and attempts to kill him. Yashvi tackles her to the ground and Scarlett is arrested. At the police station, Paul turns up to goad Scarlett, who replies with "trick or treat". Paul later learns that the footage from the hidden camera has been given to the press.

The following year, Scarlett finds Ned on Fandangle, a content subscription service. Using the alias Scavenger_King35, she pays Ned for various nude photographs and videos. While he is on a mini-break with Yashvi, Scarlett messages Ned and asks him to meet her, where he finally learns that she is Scavenger_King35. She demands that he paints a portrait of her for her new fiancé, as "revenge" for him ruining her life. Ned initially decides to handle this on his own, telling only his cousin Roxy Willis (Zima Anderson), but is forced to confess to Yashvi after Scarlett's behaviour becomes more erratic and she slashes his portrait of her. This puts further strain on Ned and Yashvi's relationship. Scarlett later sabotages the opening of Ned's art exhibition, by replacing his portrait of Yashvi with her damaged painting. As it is unveiled, Scarlett enters and claims that Ned has been harassing her, exposing her plan to set him up as revenge for rejecting her the previous year. She then takes off in her car, and is pursued by an enraged Ned. Scarlett stops at the maze where she stabbed Ned and he gives chase. After being found by Yashvi the following morning, he claims to have no recollection of what happened. The police later find evidence suggesting that Scarlett was attacked. Ned regains some of his memories and recalls hearing someone in the boot of his car, causing him to believe he has killed Scarlett and he is charged with her homicide.

Scarlett then uses Ned's art and exhibition space, The Hive as a hiding place and overhears Bea deciding to refute the evidence against Ned. In retaliation, Scarlett sabotages the steering in her car to kill her, but this results in Terese Willis (Rebekah Elmaloglou) injuring Kyle. Levi Canning (Richie Morris) later interviews the other driver involved in the accident that killed the rest of Scarlett's family, who confesses that Scarlett's father appeared to have difficulty steering the car. Levi reports this to Yashvi and Bea, and they also suspect Scarlett was involved in the death of her family. Yashvi and Ned plan a fake wedding to lure Scarlett out of hiding. Scarlett watches the wedding unfold and attempts to throw acid on Ned's face. However, she is stopped by Levi and the acid lands on Scarlett's face, causing burns to her face. She is taken to hospital where she eventually admits her plan to frame Ned for her murder.

Hendrix Greyson 

Hendrix Greyson, played by Ben Turland, made his first appearance on 13 September 2019. The character and Turland's casting was announced on 1 September. Hendrix joined the regular cast as the estranged son of Pierce Greyson (Tim Robards). He arrives in Erinsborough, having been expelled from boarding school, just as his father is reconciling with his love interest Chloe Brennan (April Rose Pengilly). Pierce tells Chloe that he had very little involvement in Hendrix or his sister's upbringing, leading him to struggle with his resentful and "suave" son. Hendrix later makes romantic advances towards Chloe. Hendrix was branded "a rich spoiled brat" by Matthew Myers of DNA, and Turland said that he had a lot of fun with the character. Turland said the lack of "a father figure" in Hendrix's life led to his bad behaviour and his lashing out to get some attention. This behaviour caused an initial negative reaction from viewers. On 3 June 2022, it was announced that Hendrix would be killed off following complications from a lung transplant. The storyline was planned before the show was cancelled in early 2022, after Turland decided to leave at the end of his contract.

Prudence Wallace 

Prudence "Prue" Wallace, played by Denise van Outen, made her first appearance on 20 September 2019. Van Outen's casting and character details were announced on 12 June 2019. She initially filmed alongside cast members Stefan Dennis (Paul Robinson) and Rebekah Elmaloglou (Terese Willis) while they were in London, before flying out to join them and the rest of the cast at the show's Melbourne studios. Of her casting, Van Outen said "I am thrilled to be joining the cast of one [of] the world's most iconic shows, Neighbours. To be asked is a privilege and I am very excited to get to work on a really fun storyline first in London and then heading over to Melbourne. I can't say too much just yet but my character Prue is heading to Ramsay Street to stir things up and I can't wait!"

Prue is the "enigmatic" mother of Harlow Robinson (Jemma Donovan), who was introduced earlier in 2019. Van Outen described Prue as "a lot of fun, I like the fact she is a little bit out there as well so I can play around with the character. She is a bit mischievous which is really interesting to portray." Harlow's guardians Paul and Terese decide to meet with Prue while they are honeymooning in London, but Harlow tries to deter them, knowing that Prue is a member of a cult. Prue "isn't in any rush" to have Harlow back with her and cut the meeting short. She then meets with Graham (Richard Arnold), who asks Prue to end contact with her daughter. Johnathon Hughes of Radio Times called the character "flaky, flighty" and "a hard woman to pin down". Following a brief departure, Van Outen returned in March 2020. Prue's departure aired on 18 March, as she was killed-off in a bomb explosion. Van Outen told Daniel Kilkelly of Digital Spy that she always knew her stint with the show would be short, and she was fine with Prue's death. She said, "If I was going to be part of a big episode, I wanted it to be something quite dramatic, as you want people to talk about it." She added that there was still a chance Prue could return in the future.

Prue meets with her daughter, Harlow's grandfather Paul Robinson and his wife Terese Willis in a London park to find out more about them. Prue asks after Harlow, and learns that she has not mentioned Prue much. Prue explains that she is in the wellness industry and tells Paul and Terese about the philosophies she lives her life by. Prue notices a man, Graham, watching her and cuts the meeting short. As she walks off, Graham asks how it went and Prue tells him that Paul and Terese seem kind and are looking after Harlow. He then tells her that it is time to let Harlow go because if she is not with them, she is against them. Prue sends Harlow a text asking her not to worry if she does not hear from her for a while. Just over a month later, Prue comes to Erinsborough and voices her disapproval about Harlow's living arrangement, as Paul and Terese's hotel has been caught up in a sex tape scandal. Harlow defends them, but when Paul comes home drunk and Prue learns Ned Willis (Ben Hall) is recovering from a stab wound, she wants to remove Harlow from the house. However, Prue is convinced to stay at Number 22. She later shames Paul's daughter Amy Williams (Zoe Cramond) for being in the sex tape. Prue befriends Gary Canning (Damien Richardson) at The Waterhole and they go on several dates. Harlow worries that her mother has forgotten her, but Prue makes sure to prioritise her and they start to reconnect.

Prue receives phone calls from the Restoration Order demanding payment, and she is tempted to steal from the till at The 82, but Gary catches her. She explains that the Restoration Order has helped her reach her full potential as a woman and mother, but she is worried that she will lose it all if she cannot pay the monthly fee. Gary asks to hear more about the Order and he later lends her the money she needs. Prue also attempts to convince Harlow that they could make a good life for themselves in London. When she catches Terese drinking wine, knowing that she is an alcoholic, Prue asks her to support her plan to take Harlow home to the UK and Terese agrees. Harlow decides to leave with Prue, unaware that her mother is still in the Restoration Order and planning on having her join. However, as they stop at a milk bar, Harlow recalls Prue telling Terese to "trust in the process" and realises that she is still in the Order. Prue tries to defend her intentions and the Order, but Harlow tells Prue that she will not be joining up. She begs her mother to stay in Erinsborough with her, but Prue leaves her outside the shop and flies back to London.

The following year, Prue returns to Erinsborough claiming that she has left the Restoration Order. She tries to repair her relationship with Harlow. During a barbecue at the Cannings, Prue and Gary announce that they are engaged, shocking Harlow and Gary's family. After attempting to rebuild her relationship with Harlow, it is revealed that Prue did not leave the Order – rather, she was forced out due to a lack of finances. Upon finding out, Gary calls off the wedding and decides to join his son on the glamping trip. Prue takes the box containing their honeymoon destination and follows him in her car. She pulls over when she gets lost and leaves Harlow a voicemail. She then opens the box, looking for champagne, and is killed instantly by a bomb planted by Finn Kelly (Rob Mills).

Graham Isheev 

Graham Isheev, played by Richard Arnold, appeared on 20 September 2019. Arnold's casting details were announced alongside that of Denise van Outen, who plays Prue Wallace. Arnold makes a one episode appearance in scenes set and filmed in London. He commented, "I always knew my career would hit a 'dead end' eventually, but I never dreamed it would do so in such spectacular fashion joining the cast of Neighbours, home to the most famous cul-de-sac in television. G'Day Britain!" Arnold's character, Graham "exerts an unhealthy influence over Prue." Simon Timblick of What's on TV branded him "a shady character".

Graham watches Prue Wallace meet her daughter's grandfather Paul Robinson (Stefan Dennis) and his wife Terese Willis (Rebekah Elmaloglou) in St James's Park. As Prue walks past him, Graham asks her how the meeting went and she says that Harlow (Jemma Donovan) is being well looked after. Graham then tells Prue that it is time to let Harlow go because if she is not with them, then she is against them. Prue agrees.

Grant Hargreaves 

Grant Hargreaves, played by Paul Mercurio, made his first appearance on 8 October 2019. Mercurio's casting was announced on 29 September, while the character has been mention on-screen several times. Grant is Mackenzie Hargreaves's (Georgie Stone) estranged father. His friend Shane Rebecchi (Nicholas Coghlan) has been trying to track him down on Mackenzie's behalf, as she hopes to reconcile with him. As Grant and Mackenzie meet for the first time since she transitioned, Grant "immediately slips up" when he calls Mackenzie by her old name. Seeing Grant's ignorance, Shane calls out his behaviour and tells him to support his daughter. When Grant meets with Mackenzie again, he asks that they start over and calls her by her real name. Mercurio reprises the role in June 2022, as Grant returns to Erinsborough to give Mackenzie away at her wedding to Hendrix Greyson (Ben Turland).

After learning that Shane Rebecchi has been trying to get in contact with him, Grant calls him to say that he is coming to Erinsborough. Grant goes to Harold's Café, where he meets Shane's wife Dipi Rebecchi (Sharon Johal) and is reunited with his daughter Mackenzie. He calls her by her old name, Michael, and reveals that he thought about contacting her after her mother died, but he was busy with work and was worried about what he would find if he did. Grant admits that he still thinks of Mackenzie as a boy, causing her to leave. Shane comes to see Grant and says that he regrets telling Grant to put a stop to Mackenzie dressing as a girl when she was young. Shane berates Grant for his attitude towards Mackenzie, leading Grant to ask her if they can try again and calls her Mackenzie for the first time. Mackenzie tells Grant about the Be You Ball and invites him to partner her for the father-daughter dance. He asks to think about it, but later turns up at the Rebecchi's home in a suit. He spends time with the other parents, while their children go to a pre-dance party. Grant leaves the house at the same time as the others, but he does not turn up at The Pavilion. Shane finds Grant at the cafe and tells him that he will miss the dance if they do not leave soon. Grant says that he cannot go, as dancing with his son in a father-daughter dance is wrong. He refuses to change his mind and asks Shane to explain it to Mackenzie. He also asks that Shane tells her he is sorry, and he leaves for Barham.

Months later, Shane contacts Grant about Mackenzie's 18th birthday and learns that Grant has been injured in a workplace accident. Shane tells Dipi that they need to help, as Grant is broke. He also wants to tell Mackenzie the news, but Dipi tells him not to get involved as Grant has already hurt Mackenzie. Shane later sends Grant some money, and Grant comes to Erinsborough. He apologises to Mackenzie for not attending the school dance and for missing her 18th birthday, which Mackenzie accepts when Grant says he wants to get to know her. Grant meets with Shane's brother Toadfish Rebecchi (Ryan Moloney) to discuss a WorkSafe claim. Toadie tells Grant that he will take on his case pro bono. After spending the afternoon together, Mackenzie asks Grant to stay in town longer. Dipi confronts Grant about his relationship with Mackenzie and whether he is going to hurt her again. He tells her that he is trying to accept Mackenzie. He attends the Lassiters Pride event, where he meets Mackenzie's boyfriend Richie Amblin (Lachlan Millar), and refers to Mackenzie as his daughter for the first time. Grant tells Shane that his WorkSafe claim has been successful and he will return to work when his back is better, so that he can pay the loan back. Before he leaves town, Grant tells Mackenzie that when he left her mother, he met another woman and they had two children. Mackenzie realises that he has not told them about her, but Grant explains that he was ashamed of what he did and how he abandoned his family. He tells her that he wants to put things right and invites her to meet her siblings, which she accepts. 

Two years later, Grant returns to Erinsborough for Mackenzie's wedding to Hendrix Greyson and clashes with Hendrix's father, Pierce Greyson (Tim Robards). Grant walks Mackenzie down the aisle and gives her away to Hendrix, and Grant later leaves after the wedding. Grant returns to Erinsborough a few days later, to support Mackenzie after Hendrix's sudden death. When Grant criticises Mackenzie's ways of grieving out of overprotection, Mackenzie tells him to leave town.

Kane Jones 

Kane Jones, played Barry Conrad, made his first appearance on 15 November 2019. The character was introduced as part of a storyline involving Ned Willis (Ben Hall), who joins a fight club in a bid to ease his PTSD. Conrad was later asked to reprise the role, as Kane returns to host some illegal blackjack games that Hendrix Greyson (Benny Turland) takes part in. Conrad expressed his delight at being asked back, saying "It was an absolute thrill. I was totally over the moon, because there was nothing to suggest that Kane would be back after the viewers last saw him. He went to jail and it seemed like that was it. All this time had passed, so when I got the call to say that I'd be coming back, I was like: 'Yes!' It was very exciting.""

Conrad confirmed that Kane was released from prison for good behaviour and that viewers would see a different side to him. As Hendrix accumulates a big debt, Kane has to scare and intimidate him in a bid to get his money. When asked by Digital Spy's Daniel Kilkelly whether Kane is capable of killing someone, Conrad reckoned that his character does not have "the DNA to kill – I don't think he's that guy."  Conrad also said that he and his character are quite different, describing Kane as being more serious than him. Conrad also told Kilkelly that he would like to explore Kane's backstory one day, as he had to create his own to justify Kane's behaviour. He explained: "I think it'd be great to actually flesh out some of that in the future. There's definitely more to Kane and I've tried to explore that as the episodes unfold in his interactions with certain characters. He's a complex, layered guy – like we all are. There's not just one side to anyone. This time around, rather than Kane just standing there looking grumpy and beating people up, you'll see more light and shade, a bit of levity. That's really exciting."

While working out at local gym The Shed, Kane notices owner Aaron Brennan (Matt Wilson) telling Ned Willis to take things easy. Kane gives Ned an address and tells him to come after 9pm if he wants to let loose properly. When Ned shows up to see a fight in progress, Kane tells him that there are no rules and no holding back. Kane later challenges Ned to a fight, which Ned wins. After Aaron sees Kane and Ned talking, he follows Ned to a fight and persuades Ned to stop, however, Kane pressures Ned to continue. Bea Nilsson (Bonnie Anderson) meets with Kane to arrange a fight, but Ned pulls Bea out before she is hurt and he stops going to the fights. Yashvi Rebecchi (Olivia Junkeer) calls the police on the ring and gets it shut down. Kane later watches Yashvi and Ned together at The Waterhole and spikes her drink with broken glass. Yashvi's father Shane Rebecchi (Nicholas Coghlan) meets with Kane to confront him, but he is interrupted by Yashvi and Ned. Kane threatens them, but Yashvi gets Kane to admit that he runs the fight ring and put the glass in her drink, before revealing that she has recorded everything and already contacted the police, who turn up and arrest Kane. Ned later visits Kane in prison to ask about Zenin Alexio, who believes Ned saw something at the fight ring and is threatening him and Yashvi. Kane does not have much information and tells Ned that those men do not mess around, and that he is safer inside.

Months later, having been paroled for good behaviour, Kane returns to Erinsborough to run illegal blackjack games at Lassiters Hotel. Hendrix Greyson attends one of the games and wins big, but he loses badly at the following game as Kane encourages him to bet more and more. Kane is forced to move the games after the hotel receives complaints, so Hendrix suggests they use his former house on Ramsay Street. Kane meets Aaron Brennan and Nicolette Stone (Charlotte Chimes) outside the community centre, where he is doing his community service. At the game later that night, Hendrix loses again but asks to borrow some money from Kane, who agrees. Hendrix continues to lose and ends up owing Kane $10,000, which he demands Hendrix pay the following day. Hendrix tells Kane that he cannot pay, as his father is away on business, so Kane gives him more time, but tells him that he will charge a lot of interest. Kane later threatens Hendrix by sending him a bullet. Hendrix gives Kane a diamond necklace to pay off his debt, but Kane says it only covers half of it. He also tells Hendrix that he wants to continue using the house for future games, which he expects Hendrix to attend. Hendrix bets and loses the house to Kane, who begins hassling him for the deed. When Kane learns Nicolette needs money, he invites her to join the blackjack games. Kane makes another threat towards Hendrix, leading to Hendrix taking a gun from another player for protection. Kane later turns up at the house and refuses to leave unless Hendrix signs it over to him. When Hendrix reveals that his stepmother knows about the games and is going to the police, Kane grabs hold of him and is about to hurt him when Chloe Brennan (April Rose Pengilly) arrives and tells him the police are coming. Kane is later arrested by Yashvi and her partner. At the station, they question him about kidnapping Hendrix's ex-girlfriend Harlow Robinson (Jemma Donovan), but Kane insists that he is not responsible and is later found to have an alibi.

Others

References

External links 
 Characters and cast at the official Neighbours website
 Characters and cast at the Internet Movie Database

2019
, Neighbours
2019 in Australian television